The Ellsworth Mountains are the highest mountain ranges in Antarctica, forming a  long and  wide chain of mountains in a north to south configuration on the western margin of the Ronne Ice Shelf in Marie Byrd Land. They are bisected by Minnesota Glacier to form the Sentinel Range to the north and the Heritage Range to the south. The former is by far the higher and more spectacular with Mount Vinson constituting the highest point on the continent. The mountains are located within the Chilean Antarctic territorial claim but outside of the Argentinian and British ones.

Discovery
The mountains were discovered on November 23, 1935, by Lincoln Ellsworth in the course of a trans-Antarctic flight from Dundee Island to the Ross Ice Shelf. He gave them the descriptive name Sentinel Range.

The mountains were mapped in detail by the U.S. Geological Survey from ground surveys and U.S. Navy aerial photography, 1958–1966. When it became evident that the mountains comprise two distinct ranges, the US-ACAN restricted the application of Sentinel Range to the high northern one and gave the name Heritage Range to the southern one; the Committee recommended the name of the discoverer for this entire group of mountains.

Geology

Geologically, the Ellsworth Mountains occupy a discrete block of continental crust known as the Ellsworth-Whitmore Mountain terrane. It was likely once part of the Cape Fold Belt that was detached from southern Africa during the breakup of Gondwana and later incorporated into Antarctica.

Within the Heritage Group is the Union Glacier Formation of ashflow tuff-lahar deposits, the Hyde Glacier Formation of graywacke-argillite-conglomerate, the Drake Icefall Formation of black shales and marble, the Conglomerate Ridge Formation of conglomerate and quartzite, the Liberty Hills-Springer Peak-Frazier Ridge Formations of quartzite-argillite, and the Minaret Formation of marble. Within the Crashsite Group is the Howard Nunataks Formation of quartzites, the Mt. Liptak Formation of quartzites, and the Mount Wyatt Earp Formation of quartzites. Major deformation of the sedimentary rocks occurred during the Gondwanide orogeny, followed by later uplift.

Climate
The temperatures in the Ellsworth Mountains average around -30 °C (-20 °F). The best time for expeditions are November through January, mid-summer in the Southern Hemisphere. However, arranging an outing here is a difficult task, requiring either official scientific sponsorship or considerable financial resources.

Maps
 Newcomer Glacier. Scale 1:250 000 topographic map. Reston, Virginia: US Geological Survey, 1961.
 Vinson Massif. Scale 1:250 000 topographic map. Reston, Virginia: US Geological Survey, 1988.
 Union Glacier. Scale 1:250 000 topographic map. Reston, Virginia: US Geological Survey, 1966.
 Liberty Hills. Scale 1:250 000 topographic map. Reston, Virginia: US Geological Survey, 1966.
 Antarctic Digital Database (ADD). Scale 1:250000 topographic map of Antarctica. Scientific Committee on Antarctic Research (SCAR). Since 1993, regularly updated.

See also
 Ellsworth Subglacial Highlands
 Antarctic Ice Marathon
 Union Glacier Camp
 Pirrit Hills

Gallery

References

External links

 Geologic Map of the Ellsworth Mountains
 Scientific Committee on Antarctic Research (SCAR)
 Ellsworth Mountains. SCAR Composite Gazetteer of Antarctica

 
West Antarctica
Mountain ranges of Ellsworth Land
Filchner-Ronne Ice Shelf